Rakusen's is a British kosher food manufacturer established in 1900 in Leeds, where it continues to operate today. Although best known for its matzo, matzo meal and matzo crackers, it also produces soups, beans, Tomor margarine, and other products.

Rakusen's was founded by a watch maker, Lloyd Rakusen, who started from baking matzos in his own back room and grew to form a factory in the city of Leeds, eventually passing the thriving company onto his family in 1944 on his death.

Rakusen's is owned by Andrew Simpson, who took over the company in 2015.

Rakusen's products are all approved by the London Beth Din. Most British supermarkets stock some Rakusen's products all year, and special Passover matzo at Passover.

References 

Food manufacturers of the United Kingdom
Food and drink companies established in 1900
Matzo
Kosher food
1900 establishments in England
Manufacturing companies based in Leeds
Jews and Judaism in the United Kingdom
Jews and Judaism in England